Conothamnus neglectus is a member of the family Myrtaceae endemic to Western Australia. It blooms in between July and September producing yellow flowers.

This plant was first formally described in 1904 by Ludwig Diels who published the description in Botanische jahrbucher fur systematik, pflanzengeschichte und pflanzengeographie under the heading Fragmenta Phytographiae Australiae occidentalis:Beitrage zur Kenntnis der Pflanzen Westaustraliens, ihrer Verbreitung und ihrer Lebensverhaltnisse ("Contributions to the knowledge of the plants of West Australia, where they are found and their conditions of existence").

Found on flats and swampy plains in an area along the south coast in the Great Southern region of Western Australia where it grows in sandy or loamy or clay soils.

References

neglectus
Plants described in 1904